The 1988 Ebel U.S. Pro Indoor was a men's tennis tournament played on indoor carpet courts that was part of the 1988 Nabisco Grand Prix. It was the 21st edition of the tournament and was played at the Spectrum in Philadelphia, Pennsylvania in the United States from February 22 to February 29, 1988. Second-seeded Tim Mayotte won his second consecutive singles title at the event.

Finals

Singles

 Tim Mayotte defeated  John Fitzgerald 4–6, 6–2, 6–2, 6–3 
 It was Mayotte's 1st title of the year and the 9th of his career.

Doubles

 Kelly Evernden /  Johan Kriek defeated  Kevin Curren /  Danie Visser 7–6, 6–3 
 It was Evernden's only title of the year and the 5th of his career. It was Kriek's 1st title of the year and the 21st of his career.

References

External links
 ITF tournament edition details

Ebel U.S. Pro Indoor
U.S. Pro Indoor
U.S. Professional Indoor
U.S. Professional Indoor
U.S. Professional Indoor